The Clan is a 2015 biographical crime film written and directed by Pablo Trapero and starring Guillermo Francella and Peter Lanzani. It was selected to be screened in the main competition section of the 72nd Venice International Film Festival, where director Pablo Trapero won the Silver Lion. The film was selected as the Argentine entry for the Best Foreign Language Film at the 88th Academy Awards but was not nominated.

Plot
The story is based on the case of the Puccio family from Buenos Aires, that kidnapped four people—three of whom they murdered—in the 1980s.

The Puccios appear to be a typical middle-class family from the affluent district of San Isidro, with aspirations of moving up into upper class. The family comprises Arquímedes Puccio, the family patriarch; Epifanía Puccio, his wife; Alejandro, their eldest son and a star rugby player; Daniel "Maguila", their middle child, who'd left the country years ago and hadn't kept in touch; Silvia, their eldest daughter, a schoolteacher; Guillermo, their youngest son, who is still in high school; and Adriana, their youngest daughter, who is in middle school.

At the end of the Falklands War in 1982, Arquímedes, who had been working for the state's intelligence services in operations to capture communist guerrilla fighters, becomes the owner of a small shop, a deli. In order to maintain his financial status, he decides to turn to crime and start kidnapping people for ransom, targeting wealthy families. Alejandro starts to collaborate with his father, by identifying potential hostages, taking advantage of his popularity among friends and acquaintances to not raise suspicion.

The first victim is Ricardo Manoukian, a friend and teammate of Alejandro's. Though the kidnapping is successful, Arquímedes kills Ricardo anyway, to avoid any chances of being identified as the kidnapper. After discovering Ricardo has been killed, Alejandro has a bout of conscience, but his father convinces him to keep the secret by assuring him that if Ricardo had been left alive, he would have identified them as the culprits and gotten them all arrested.

The ransom improves the Puccios' economic situation and, by early 1983, they replace their family deli with a successful store selling sporting equipment. Alejandro meets a girl called Monica at the store, and, after a few dates, she becomes his girlfriend. Meanwhile, Gustavo Contenpomi, a friend of Arquímedes' who is furious after being deceived in a business deal with entrepreneur Florencio Aulet, contacts the Puccios and suggests they make Florencio their next victim. Instead, Arquímedes and his cronies kidnap Florencio's son, Eduardo; since he is one of Alejandro's friends, and thus he's easier to lure into a trap. The Aulets pay the ransom, but Eduardo has already been murdered, and his body buried in a shallow grave, on an empty construction lot.

In December 1983, after the return to democracy in Argentina, Arquímedes goes to visit imprisoned military officer Aníbal Gordon—who had participated with Puccio in the kidnapping of a businessman in 1973—and asks for advice on how to continue with the Clan's activities in the new political landscape. Gordon advises him to lie low, since the military will have more difficulty protecting him now that they've lost control of the country, but Arquímedes does not heed the warning.

Alejandro accompanies his youngest brother, Guillermo, to the airport, since Guillermo
is going abroad on a sports trip. At the gate, Guillermo confesses that he knows what Alejandro and their father had been up to and says he will not be returning after the tour is over, since he is afraid of what will happen if the family's crimes are discovered. Before leaving, Guillermo begs his brother to get out while he still can. Listening to his brother's plea, Alejandro decides not to join his father in the next kidnapping: that of another businessman acquainted with the family, Emilio Naum. Due to Alejandro's absence, the plot fails, and Naum is murdered after refusing to stop his car when Arquímedes and his goons begin the abduction. Angered, Arquímedes returns home and beats Alejandro, blaming him for the failed kidnapping and accusing him of being ungrateful for all that Arquímedes sacrificed to get him a cushy lifestyle.

To reconcile with his father, Alejandro travels abroad to convince his other brother, Maguila, to return to Argentina and join the Clan in their operations. Now, in 1985, the group kidnaps businesswoman Nélida Bollini Prado and keep her prisoner in their home's basement. However, things do not go according to plan: the ransom negotiations fail; Adriana hears the woman's screams coming from the basement and realizes what had been going on; and Arquímedes gets a call from his former military superiors warning him that his stunts have garnered too much public attention, so he no longer has their protection.

In August 1985, when Arquímedes and Maguila collect the ransom in a service station, they are arrested by the police, who then break into the Puccio house, free the kidnapped victim, and arrest the family, with the exception of Adriana. The case causes a frenzy among the media, who dub the family the "Puccio Clan".

The prosecuting attorney shows Arquímedes the overwhelming evidence against him and tries to broker a deal: if Arquímedes confesses to being the mastermind behind the kidnappings, his family will not be indicted as accomplices. Arquímedes, however, insists that he'd been compelled to carry out the crimes by his military superiors and refuses to sacrifice himself for his family.

While his rugby team and Monica believe in his innocence, Alejandro cannot withstand the pressure. After violently arguing with his father in their jail cell (during which Arquímedes goads Alejandro to punch him, so Arquímedes can falsely claim the guards beat him), Alejandro tries to commit suicide by throwing himself off the fifth floor of the Tribunal building while he is being taken to testify.

The film ends with a series of texts detailing the family's fate: 
Alejandro survived his fall and was sentenced to life in prison. While serving his sentence, he tried to commit suicide four more times. Monica kept visiting him for years, until he asked her to stop doing so and instead move on with her life. Alejandro died [of pneumonia, aged 49] in 2008, a few months after being released on probation. 
Maguila never served his sentence, since he fled the country - presumably to Australia, Brazil, or New Zealand - before he could be tried. In 2013, he returned to Argentina after the charges were dropped due to the statute of limitations. 
Guillermo was never indicted for his family's crimes. He never returned to the country nor contacted his family, and his whereabouts are unknown. 
Epifanía and Silvia were freed from prison for lack of evidence. [Silvia succumbed to cancer at 52 in 2011.]
Adriana was also never indicted and, after the trial began, her surname was changed, and she moved in with her maternal uncles. After many years, she returned to live with her mother [in the very house where the kidnapping victims had been held]. 
Arquímedes was sentenced to life imprisonment but was eventually released on parole in 2008. During his imprisonment, he studied to become a lawyer, and started working as such after his release. His family never made contact with him after he regained his freedom. He died [from a stroke] in 2013, in La Pampa, and since his corpse was unclaimed, he was buried in an unmarked, communal grave.

Cast
 Guillermo Francella as Arquímedes Puccio
 Peter Lanzani as Alejandro Puccio
 Lili Popovich as Epifanía Puccio
 Gastón Cocchiarale as Maguila Puccio
 Giselle Motta as Silvia Puccio
 Franco Masini as Guillermo Puccio
 Antonia Bengoechea as Adriana Puccio
 Stefanía Koessl as Mónica Sörvick
 Fernando Miró as Aníbal Gordon

Production
Trapero initiated the idea of making a film about the Puccios. It was shot between late 2014 and early 2015. Due to the long period of production, the film missed the opportunity to participate in the Cannes festival.

Guillermo Manoukian and Rogelia Pozzi, relatives of the Puccios' victims, knew early on about Trapero's intention to shoot the film. They supported the project, as long as it was a serious film, and provided information about the case which was incorporated into the plot.

The film was produced by K&S Films, Matanza Cine and El Deseo in association with Telefe and Telefónica Studios.

Reception
The film opened in Argentina on 13 August 2015, to generally positive reviews. It had the largest opening weekend of any Argentinean film in history, with a box office total of 32 million pesos and 505,000 tickets sold between its opening Thursday and that Sunday, representing 53% of all cinema-goers, seven times more than the second most viewed film, Ted 2. This surpassed the previous record, of the film Wild Tales (2014). According to BBC News, 1.5 million people saw the film in its first two weeks of release.

The film was screened at the Venice Film Festival and Toronto International Film Festival in September 2015. Both Variety and The Hollywood Reporter singled out the arresting soundtrack in their reviews; Variety called the choice of music "among the film's most unnerving strategies, reminiscent of Spike Lee's Summer of Sam, in which celebratory pop tunes evoke the era even as they practically serve to encourage the horrors depicted onscreen"; The Hollywood Reporter noted that the "loud, upbeat songs ... provide a counterpoint ... [suggesting] how kidnapping became simply a part of life for the Puccios. It's never clearer than in a daring montage sequence that matches Monica's cries of ecstasy during a bout of lovemaking with the cries for help of a kidnapping victim in the family's home. For these folks, there seems to be a mighty fine line between love and cruelty".

The film's success led to a 2015 TV mini-series also focused on the Puccio family, Historia de un clan, starring Alejandro Awada.

Awards

|-
| align = "center" rowspan = "3" | 2015 || rowspan="2"|72nd Venice International Film Festival
| Golden Lion
| rowspan="2"| Pablo Trapero
| 
|-
| Silver Lion
| 
|-
|2015 Toronto International Film Festival
| Platform section
|
| 
|  
|-
| align = "center" rowspan = "12" | 2016 || rowspan = "3" | 21st Forqué Awards || colspan = "2" | Best Film ||  || rowspan = "3" | 
|-
| colspan = "2" | Best Latin-American Film || 
|-
| Best Actor || Guillermo Francella || 
|-
| 30th Goya Awards || colspan = "2" | Best Ibero-American Film ||  || 
|-
| 58th Ariel Awards || colspan = "2" | Best Ibero-American Film ||  || 
|-
| rowspan = "6" | 3rd Platino Awards || colspan = "2" | Best Ibero-American Film ||  || rowspan = "6" | 
|-
| Best Director || Pablo Trapero ||  
|-
| Best Actor || Guillermo Francella || 
|-
| Best Art Direction || Sebastián Orgambide || 
|-
| Best Editing || Pablo Trapero, Alejandro Carrillo Penovi || 
|-
| Best Sound || Vicente D'Elía, Leandro de Loredo || 
|}

See also
 List of Argentine submissions for the Academy Award for Best Foreign Language Film
 List of submissions to the 88th Academy Awards for Best Foreign Language Film

References

External links
 

2015 films
2015 crime drama films
2015 biographical drama films
Argentine crime drama films
Argentine biographical drama films
2010s Spanish-language films
Spanish crime drama films
Spanish biographical drama films
20th Century Fox films
Films directed by Pablo Trapero
Films set in the 1980s
Films set in Buenos Aires
Films shot in Buenos Aires
Crime films based on actual events
Warner Bros. films
El Deseo films
2010s Argentine films
2010s Spanish films